Lancet Neurology is a peer-reviewed scientific journal that was established in 2002 by Elsevier BV.

Abstracting and indexing 
Lancet Neurology is abstracted and indexed the following bibliographic databases:
Science Citation Index Expanded
Scopus

According to the Journal Citation Reports, the journal has a 2020 impact factor of 44.182.

References

External links 
 

English-language journals
Elsevier academic journals
Publications established in 2002
Neurology journals